Catherine FitzCharles (born 1658) was the illegitimate daughter of Charles II of England and his mistress Catherine Pegge. Her older brother by one year, Charles FitzCharles, was made the 1st Earl of Plymouth by his father. Little is known about Catherine's life, but she is thought to have become a Benedictine nun at Dunkirk Abbey in Dunkirk, France, like many other highborn Englishwomen during the reign of Charles II. She is believed to have resided there under the religious name, Sister Ophelia, until her death in 1759 at the impressive age of 101. However, the shockingly small amount of information available about Catherine FitzCharles leads some to conclude that Catherine died in infancy or early childhood instead.

Notes

References 

 
 
 
 
 
 

1658 births
1759 deaths
17th-century English people
17th-century Scottish people
18th-century English people
18th-century Scottish people
18th-century English women
Year of death uncertain
Illegitimate children of Charles II of England
Women of the Stuart period
English centenarians
Scottish centenarians
Women centenarians
Daughters of kings